Batu Gajah Highway (Perak state route A8) is a major highway in Perak, Malaysia. The highway connects Pusing in the west, passing Batu Gajah and Kellie's Castle until Gopeng in the east. This highway was upgraded from single carriageway into dual carriageway in 2001.

Route background
The Kilometre Zero of the highway is located at Gopeng, at its junctions with the Federal Route 1, the main trunk road of central Peninsular Malaysia.

At most sections, the Batu Gajah Highway was built under the JKR R5 road standard, allowing maximum speed limit of up to 90 km/h.

List of junctions

Highways in Malaysia
Roads in Perak